Kurd Kisshauer (* December 29, 1886 in Berlin; † November 14, 1958 in Frankfurt/Main) was a member of the German society for astronomy. During the Third Reich he was employed at Amt Rosenberg.

Life 
Kisshauer (in German also Kißhauer) possessed a doctorate in political science. He soon gained a greater reputation, however, as an amateur astronomer. In 1919, he was charged with selling the equipment of the closed observatory in Bothkamp. In 1922, Ernst II, Duke of Saxe-Altenburg engaged him for the newly set-up observatory in Wolfersdorf.

Afterwards Kisshauer moved to the near Jena where he worked at Carl Zeiss and wrote first publications on astronomy and projection planetaria designed by Walther Bauersfeld. In 1926, he founded and led the municipal planetarium of Dresden, situated north-west of Großer Garten. Around 1930 Kisshauer moved to Berlin where he lived in the Großsiedlung Siemensstadt. 

As a fellow worker of Alfred Rosenberg he was charged during World War II with psychological warfare, distributing specially written horoscopes. Kisshauer was the contact person of Karl Ernst Krafft, collecting and evaluating his material. In 1941, he got deeply involved in Nazi internal conflicts on astrology after the "Hess affair". Moreover, he imposed some influence to prevent followers of Einstein's theory of relativity from getting professorships in theoretical physics.

After war Kisshauer again gave lectures on astronomy, e.g. at Senckenberg Gesellschaft für Naturforschung and in radio broadcasts. Ellic Howe quoted him in his books on astrology in the Third Reich, regretting that it was not possible to interview Kisshauer because of his death some years before.

Works 
 Städtisches Planetarium auf dem Ausstellungsgelände. Dr. Güntz'sche Stiftung, Dresden, 1927.
 Der Sternenhimmel im Feldglas. Hesse & Becker, Leipzig, 1928.
 Horoskop und Familie. In: Praktikum für Familienforscher, Vol. 22, Degener & Co., Leipzig, 1932.
 Sternenlauf und Lebensweg: Betrachtungen über Astrologie. Reclam, Leipzig, 1935 and 1941.

Literature

About the astronomer 
 Gudrun Wolfschmidt: Astronomisches Mäzenatentum. BoD – Books on Demand, p. 76, 2009
 Felix Lühning: "--eine ausnehmende Zierde und Vortheil": Geschichte der Kieler Universitätssternwarte und ihrer Vorgängerinnen, 1770-1950: zwei Jahrhunderte Arbeit und Forschung zwischen Grenzen und Möglichkeiten. Wachholtz, 2007

About time with Rosenberg 
 Ellic Howe: Nostradamus and the Nazis: a footnote to the history of the Third Reich. Arborfield, 1965 
 Ellic Howe: Astrology: a recent history including the untold story of its role in World War II. Walker, 1968 
 Ellic Howe: Astrology and psychological warfare during World War II., Rider, 1972

Notes

External links 
 Kurd Kisshauer in the Open Library

1886 births
1958 deaths
20th-century German astronomers
Nazi Party politicians